Oliver Marach and Leonardo Mayer were the defending champions but decided not to participate.
David Marrero and Fernando Verdasco won the title after defeating Michal Mertiňák and André Sá 6–4, 6–4 in the final.

Seeds

Draw

Draw

References
Main Draw

Copa Claro - Doubles
2012 Doubles